Midlands 2 East (North) is a level 7 English Rugby Union league and level 2 of the Midlands League, made up of teams from the northern part of the East Midlands region including clubs from Derbyshire, Lincolnshire, Nottinghamshire and the occasional team from Leicestershire, with home and away matches played throughout the season.  When this division began in 1992 it was known as Midlands East 1, until it was split into two regional divisions called Midlands 3 East (North) and Midlands 3 East (South) ahead of the 2000–01 season.  Further restructuring of the Midlands leagues ahead of the 2009–10 season, led to the current name of Midlands 2 East (North).

Promoted teams tend to move up to Midlands 1 East with champions going up automatically and the runners up having to play a playoff against the runners up from Midlands 2 East (South) for their place. Demoted teams typically drop to Midlands 3 East (North).  Each year all clubs in the division also take part in the RFU Intermediate Cup - a level 7 national competition.

2021–22

Participating teams & locations

2020–21
Due to the COVID-19 pandemic, the 2020–21 season was cancelled.

2019–20

Participating teams & locations

2018–19

Participating teams & locations

2017–18

Participating teams & locations

2016–17 teams
Ashbourne
Coalville
Kesteven (promoted from Midlands 3 East (North))
Loughborough (promoted from Midlands 3 East (North))
Market Bosworth
Matlock (relegated from Midlands 1 East)
Melbourne
Newark (relegated from Midlands 1 East)
Nottingham Casuals
Southwell  
Spalding
West Bridgford

2015–16 teams
Ashbourne
Bakewell Mannerians
Coalville
Dronfield
Mansfield (relegated from Midlands 1 East)
Market Bosworth
Melbourne
Nottingham Casuals
Southwell  (promoted from Midlands 3 East (North))
Spalding (relegated from Midlands 1 East)
Stamford
West Bridgford

2014–15 teams
Ashbourne	
Ashby (promoted from Midlands 3 East (North))	
Bakewell Mannerians	
Coalville (relegated from Midlands 1 East)
Dronfield
Loughborough
Market Bosworth (relegated from Midlands 1 West)
Matlock (relegated from Midlands 1 East)
Melbourne
Nottingham Casuals
Stamford
West Bridgford (promoted from Midlands 3 East (North))

2013–2014 Teams
Ashbourne
Bakewell Mannerians
Belgrave
Dronfield
Kesteven (promoted from Midlands 3 East (North))	
Loughborough (relegated from Midlands 1 East)
Melbourne (promoted from Midlands 3 East (North))	
Melton Mowbray	
Nottingham Casuals
Oakham	
Spalding
Stamford

2012–2013 Teams
Ashbourne
Aylestone St James
Bakewell Mannerians
Belgrave 
Coalville 
Dronfield
Kesteven
Leicester Forest
Melton Mowbray
Nottingham Casuals
Nuneaton Old Edwardians
Oakham
Sleaford

2011–2012 Teams
Ashbourne
Aylestone St James
Bakewell Mannerians
Belgrave
Leicester Forest
Market Bosworth RFC
Melton Mowbray
Newark
Nottingham Casuals
Nottingham Moderns
Oakham
West Bridgford

2010–2011 Teams
Ashby
Aylestone St James
Bakewell Mannerians
Belgrave
Lincoln
Loughborough
Market Bosworth
Market Rasen and Louth
Melton Mowbray
Nottingham Moderns
Oakham
West Bridgford

Market Rasen and Louth have won the league this season and are promoted to Midlands 1 East as champions for the season 2011/2012.  Loughborough finished second and also gained promotion by beating Peterborough Lions, who placed 2nd in Midlands 2 East (South) in the promotion playoff.

Lincoln and Ashby finished in the bottom two positions and have therefore been relegated for the coming season.

Original teams

Teams in Midlands 2 East (North) and Midlands 2 East (South) were originally part of a single division called Midlands 1 East, which contained the following sides when in was introduced in 1992:

Amber Valley - relegated from Midlands 2 East (9th)
Ampthill - promoted from East Midlands/Leicestershire (5th)
Belgrave - promoted from East Midlands/Leicestershire (3rd)
Chesterfield Panthers - promoted from Nott, Lincs & Derbyshire 1 (champions)
Dronfield - promoted from Nott, Lincs & Derbyshire 1 (5th)
Hinckley - promoted from East Midlands/Leicestershire (champions)
Luton - promoted from East Midlands/Leicestershire (4th)
Mellish - promoted from Nott, Lincs & Derbyshire 1 (4th)
Scunthorpe - relegated from Midlands 2 East (10th)
Spalding - promoted from Nott, Lincs & Derbyshire 1 (runners up)
Stewarts & Lloyds - relegated from Midlands 2 East (11th)
Stoneygate - promoted from East Midlands/Leicestershire (runners up)
West Bridgford - promoted from Nott, Lincs & Derbyshire 1 (3rd)

Midlands 2 East (North) honours

Midlands East 1 (1992–1993)

Midlands 2 East (North) and Midlands 2 East (South) were originally part of a single tier 7 division called Midlands East 1.  Promotion was to Midlands 2 and relegation to Midlands East 2.

Midlands East 1 (1993–1996)

The top six teams from Midlands 1 and the top six from North 1 were combined to create National 5 North, meaning that Midlands 1 East dropped to become a tier 8 league.  Promotion and relegation continued to Midlands 2 and  Midlands East 2.

Midlands East 1 (1996–2000)

At the end of the 1995–96 season National 5 North was discontinued and Midlands East 1 returned to being a tier 7 league.  Promotion and relegation continued to Midlands 2 and  Midlands East 2.

Midlands 3 East (North) (2000–2009)

Restructuring ahead of the 2000–01 season saw Midlands East 1 split  into two tier 7 regional leagues - Midlands 3 East (North) and Midlands 3 East (South).  Promotion was now to Midlands 2 East (formerly Midlands 2) and relegation to Midlands 4 East (North) (formerly Midlands East 2).

Midlands 2 East (North) (2009–present)

League restructuring by the RFU meant that Midlands 3 East (North) and Midlands 3 East (South) were renamed as Midlands 2 East (North) and Midlands 2 East (South), with both leagues remaining at tier 7.  Promotion was now to Midlands 1 East (formerly Midlands 2 East) and relegation to Midlands 3 East (North) (formerly Midlands 4 East (North)).

Promotion play-offs
Since the 2000–01 season there has been a play-off between the runners-up of Midlands 2 East (North) and Midlands 2 East (South) for the third and final promotion place to Midlands 1 East (asides from 2008–09 which was played between the runners up of Midlands 2 West (South) and Midlands 2 East (North) due to RFU restructuring). The team with the superior league record has home advantage in the tie.  At the end of the 2019–20 season the Midlands 2 East (South) teams have ten wins to the Midlands 2 East (North) teams eight; and the home team has won promotion on thirteen occasions compared to the away teams five.

2008–09 promotion play-offs 

As mentioned above the 2008–09 promotion playoffs in Midlands 3 were different due to RFU restructuring for the following season.  The two runners up with the worst league records in the four regional divisions at this level would have to face each other for the final promotion spot, with the team with the superior league record having home advantage.

Number of league titles

Belgrave (2)
Coalville (2)
Dronfield (2)
Melbourne (2)
Melton Mowbray (2)
Newark (2)
Dunstablians (1)
Hinckley (1)
Ilkeston (1)
Kettering (1)
Lincoln (1)
Mansfield (1)
Market Bosworth (1)
Market Rasen & Louth (1)
Matlock (1)
Nottingham Moderns (1)
Paviors (1)
Scunthorpe (1)
Spalding (1)
Syston (1)
Wellingborough (1)
West Bridgford (1)

Notes

See also
 Midlands RFU
 Leicestershire RU
 Notts, Lincs & Derbyshire RFU
 English rugby union system
 Rugby union in England

References

External links
(Current League Table)

7
3